Wayne Pepper (born 28 December 1982 from London) is a former professional English darts player who currently competes in Professional Darts Corporation events.

References

Living people
English darts players
1982 births
Sportspeople from Nottingham
Professional Darts Corporation associate players